Club Deportivo Real Juventud San Joaquín, also called Real San Joaquín, is a Chilean football club based in the commune of San Joaquín, Santiago de Chile. They currently play in the third level of Chilean football, the Segunda División.

Stadium 
The stadium of Real Juventud San Joaquín is the Stadium Arturo Vidal, named after footballer Arturo Vidal, whose home town was also San Joaquin.

 Direction: San Joaquín, Chile
 Capacity: 3,500

Coach 
  Jaime Lizama (2013-)

Honours 
 Tercera División B: 1
 2014
 Copa Absoluta: 0
 Runner-up 2015

Uniform 
 Home Uniform: T-shirt sampdoria, blue pants and half blue.
 Away Uniform: T-shirt sampdoria red, red pants and half red.
 Third Uniform: T-shirt sampdoria black, black pants and half black.

Sponsors

References 

Football clubs in Chile